Marau Airport is an airport on Marau Sound Island in the Solomon Islands it is served by solomon airlines services to Honiara..

Airlines and destinations

External links
Solomon Airlines Routes

Airports in the Solomon Islands